Nicholas Richards (born 1960) is a British singer-songwriter and record producer, best known as frontman of 1980s synthpop/new wave band Boys Don't Cry.

As a solo artist, Nikki Richards, aged 18, released the singles "If I Could Tell the World" and "I Wonder What You're Doing Tonight" on Ember Records in 1978. A third single "Oh Boy!" written by Brian Wade and produced by Alan Winstanley followed in 1979. Richards then moved to RCA Records for three more singles; "Tokyo Rising", "Factory Girl" and "Hot Love" in 1980.

In 1983, he became known as Nick Richards, and bought the Maison Rouge Recording Studios in London, where he put together the band Boys Don't Cry, remembered for their 1986 hit, "I Wanna Be a Cowboy". Boys Don't Cry re-recorded some of Richards' songs from his solo career.

Personal life
Richards has been married to his wife, Debbie, since the mid-1980s and they have seven children.  The Richards family currently resides in Malibu, California.  Richards' eldest children, son James and daughter Teddy-Rae, have joined their father in the newly revived Boys Don't Cry line-up.

References

English male singers
Male new wave singers
English new wave musicians
English songwriters
English record producers
1960 births
Living people
Place of birth missing (living people)
British male songwriters